His Royal Highness (German: Königliche Hoheit) Königliche Hoheit is a 1953 West German comedy film directed by Harald Braun and starring Dieter Borsche, Ruth Leuwerik, and Lil Dagover. It is based on the 1909 novel of the same name by Thomas Mann.

The film was made at the Göttingen Studios and on location around Fulda in Hesse. It was shot using Gevacolor. The film's sets were designed by the art director Walter Haag.

Cast

External links 

1953 films
German comedy films
West German films
Films directed by Harald Braun
Films based on works by Thomas Mann
Films set in the 1900s
German historical comedy films
1950s historical comedy films
1953 comedy films
Films based on German novels
1950s German films
Films shot at Göttingen Studios